Harry Coates is a Republican politician from Oklahoma who served as a member of the Oklahoma Senate.

Political career
Harry Coates began his political career when he was elected from Senate District 28 to the Oklahoma Senate in 2002. He won reelection unopposed in 2006, and won again in 2010. In the Senate, he was the Chairman of the Tourism and Wildlife Committee, and a member of the Business and Commerce, General Government, and Veterans and Military Affairs Committees, as well as the Subcommittee on General Government and Transportation. He is known for being the Senate author of both the Kelsey Smith-Briggs Child Protection Reform Act and the "Stand Your Ground" law.

Steering of state contract to company that hired mistress
In 2010, Coates worked to steer a $10-million state contract to a private company that had hired his mistress Haley Atwood.

Drunken-driving arrest
In May 2014, Coates was arrested in Texas on a complaint of driving while intoxicated.  Two months later, he was charged with Driving While Intoxicated.  In January 2015, he pleaded guilty to the charge.

Personal life
Coates married Betty Cole in 1969.  They had three sons, born in 1970, 1986, and 1988, the oldest of whom died at the age of 44 in 2015.

In 2010, at the age of 60, Coates admitted to his wife that he was having an affair with a 29-year-old married lobbyist, Haley Atwood.  Atwood's husband filed for divorce that same year.  Coates' wife divorced him the following year.  Coates and Atwood married the following year.  They married six months after Atwood's divorce was finalized.

References

Living people
Republican Party Oklahoma state senators
1950 births
Oklahoma politicians convicted of crimes